The 957th Day was a propaganda short produced by the US Navy in 1944.

The film uses authentic battle footage of the taking of Guam on July 21, 1944, and one narration follows the battle chronologically, while another narration mimics a radio news caster voice. The newscaster related mundane activities like baseball standings, what song is on the top of the charts, and weather, but also news relative to the war effort, like the amount of steel that Pittsburgh has shipped, the monthly Selective Service quota, and the news that one worker got a medal for not missing one day of work since Dec. 8, 1941. This is all superimposed on some very graphic combat footage.

The combat footage is compiled from several days of fighting and actually begins with ships readying for the invasion at Eniwetok (in June). The bombardment of the island lasted for thirteen days and the invasion of Guam was the beginning of a much longer battle. The film leads the viewer to believe that the island was secured on July 21, 1944, when in fact the island was not declared secure until August 10, 1944 after the loss of nearly 19,000 dead between the two sides.

See also
List of Allied propaganda films of World War II

External links
 

1944 films
American World War II propaganda shorts
American black-and-white films
1940s American films